Ajeet Singh Yadav (born 5 September 1993) is an Indian Para Athlete who competes in men's javelin throw, in F-46 category. Ajeet was included in Sports Authority of India Government of India program under Target Olympic Podium Scheme, and also currently being supported by the Olympic Gold Quest. He is pursuing his PhD in physical education and sports from LNIPE Gwalior. He made his Paralympic debut representing India at the 2020 Summer Paralympics.

Early life
Ajeet Singh was born in 1993 in Etawah Uttar Pradesh. He is studying in Gwalior, Madhya Pradesh. In 2017, he was involved in a tragic train accident while saving his friend. As a result, he is missing his left arm below the elbow. During recovery and rehab phase, almost after 4 months of accident, he took part in Para Athletic Senior National 2018 in Panchkula, Haryana.

Career
After taking the sport of para javelin, he made his international debut in 2019. He took part in 7th World Para Athletics Grand Prix held in Beijing, China and won gold medal in the javelin throw. He represented India in the 2019 World Para Athletics Championships in Dubai where he claimed a bronze medal and as a result he qualified for the 2020 Summer Paralympics. He also claimed gold medal in the 2021 World Para Athletics Grand Prix.

References

Indian male javelin throwers
Paralympic athletes of India
Male competitors in athletics with disabilities
Living people
1993 births
Athletes (track and field) at the 2020 Summer Paralympics
People from Etawah